Jerudong International School is a co-educational, boarding and day school in Brunei, Southeast Asia. It has over 1680 students - of which around 200 are boarding students. Less than 50% of its student body are Bruneians, with the remainder fulfilled by students from 55 countries. Jerudong International School first opened its doors for primary education in January 1997 and subsequently for secondary in October of the same year. JIS offers a British International education.

For the Junior School services are offered from nursery to Year 6. The Senior School offers the Middle Years Programme in Years 7, 8 and 9; the IGCSE in Years 10 and 11. In the Pre-university programme - Years 12 and 13, there is a choice between the A Level examination or IB Diploma pathway.

The school is affiliated to several British school organisations such as the Headmasters' and Headmistresses' Conference, the Federation of British International Schools in Asia and the Boarding Schools' Association. The school is highly competitive academically regionally and locally at GCSE and Pre-University levels. Its admissions process requires mandatory cognitive testing, subject examinations, a written English test, and a personality interview as part of its selection procedure. JIS is rated as the most prestigious school in Brunei by the Good School Guide.

Accreditation 
JIS is an accredited 'British School Overseas' by the Association of British Schools Overseas (AoBSOs). Its most recent inspection by PENTA International, the overseas accreditation body for OFSTED, was in January 2019. The school was the first international school in the world to achieve Outstanding, the highest level possible, in all nine inspection areas.

JIS is also an accredited IB World School and offers the IB Diploma as a pre-university option.

The School offers IGCSEs and A Levels from the Cambridge Assessment International Examination Board, Edexcel and AQA Examination Boards.

Location 

Subjects are taught at various blocks throughout the school. Uniquely, it also has its own forest trail.

Year groups 
Jerudong International School] provides comprehensive education from nursery to year 13 following a British International National Curriculum. The School is divided into the Junior School (Nursery, Kindergarten, Reception and Years 1–6) and Senior School Middle Years: Years 7-9 and Upper Years: the 2 year IGCSE course for Years 10 & 11; and, in Years 12 and 13, a pre-university pathway.

Junior School
The early years of the Junior School consist of nursery, kindergarten and reception. The school follows the UK Early Years Foundation Programme for these years. Junior years are years 1 to 6. The Junior School is usually attended by pupils from age two in nursery to age eleven in year 6.

Senior School 
The Senior School consists of middle years (years 7 to 9)  and Upper Years where students are studying for the IGCSE, and later, the A Level or IB Diploma programme (years 10 to 13).

The middle years are the first three years of the Senior School and help students to transition from Junior School and prepare for the Upper Years.

Students in years 10 and 11, the first two years of the upper years, study for a two-year programme: the GCSE or the IGCSE offered by Cambridge International Examinations and Edexcel.

Years 12 and 13 form a pre-university pathway. Students choose to study either the A-Level Examinations or the International Baccalaureate Diploma Programme. JIS has a particular focus on preparing students for admissions for UK, USA, Australia, and Canadian universities.

In 2019, around 60% of its students achieved A-Level grades at A* to B boundaries. 35% achieved over 40 points in the International Baccalaureate, with 96% of its students exceeding the world average IB Diploma score.

Subjects offered

Ugama 
Ugama is for Bruneian Muslim children born after 1 January 2006. Bruneian Muslim students attend the programme from approximately JIS Year 2 - Year 8, from 3.15pm - 5pm.

The Ugama School was established in Jerudong International School in 2005 mainly to fulfill the need of Bruneian Muslim students for primary religious education, even more so after the codification of Perintah Pendidikan Ugama Wajib Brunei 2012 (literal translation: Brunei Compulsory Religious Education Order 2012). Under the Order, it is compulsory for parents in which at least one of them is Bruneian citizen to ensure their children who are Muslim, born after 1 January 2006 and reside in the country to attend primary religious school. At the end of Ugama years, students sit for Sijil Sekolah-Sekolah Rendah Ugama (literal translation: Religious Primary Schools Certificate). Generally students have completed the Ugama school by Year 8; a few may finish at the later years because they may have resided outside of the country in their early years.

Boarding 
Jerudong International School offers boarding for over 200 Boarding students from 11 years of age. Students can be either weekly boarders or full term boarders. Boarders are allocated to one of the four boarding houses run by teachers from the school. The boys houses are Eagle House and Ibis House. Kingfisher House and Osprey House are for the girls. All Boarding Houses cater students of Years 7 above. All Houses are safely located within the extensive  school campus.

Campus 
Jerudong International School is known to have facilities for various academic and non-academic uses.

Sports Complex
The Sports Complex opened in January 2017 and is situated in the area between the main school buildings and boarding houses. It has two indoor multi-purpose courts, one 8 lane, 25m indoor swimming pool and fitness room. There are also grounds for outdoor sports such as football and rugby, as well as another swimming pool of 50m in length with four lanes.

Arts Centre 
The Jerudong International School Arts Centre is a multi-purpose complex dedicated to the performing arts which was opened in October 2011. The Arts Centre comprises a theatre, which can accommodate up to 725 guests on normal seating, a Black Box Theatre, an Art Gallery, a Conference Room, Orchestra Rehearsal Room, spaces for exhibition, dance studio and several bespoke drama classrooms. The JIS Arts Centre has also become the venue for Toyota Classics Orchestra in Brunei since 2012. In 2017, the Earl and Countess of Wessex visited the school and Arts Centre.

JIS Orchestra
The JIS orchestra is one of the few orchestras in Brunei and has performed for international dignitaries such as Crown Prince Al-Muhtadee Billah, Prince Charles of Wales and Camilla, Duchess of Cornwall. As an expression of appreciation after a private concert, Prince Al-Muhtadee Billah gave the JIS Orchestra the Brunei model of the Fazioli concert grand piano which was produced with inlays of precious stones, mother of pearl and exotic woods. The piano is reportedly worth over US$400,000.

Affiliation 
Jerudong International School is a member of several British school organisations, namely the Headmasters' and Headmistresses' Conference,  Association of British Schools Overseas, the Federation of British International Schools in Asia, the Council of British International Schools and the Boarding Schools Association.

The GCSE, IGCSE and A Level qualifications are based on AQA, Cambridge International Examinations and Edexcel. Jerudong International School is also an IB World School and has offered the IB Diploma Programme since 8 April 2011.

Notable alumni
 Prince Abdul Malik
 Prince Abdul Mateen
 Princess Rashidah Sa'adatul Bolkiah
 Phil Wang

References

British international schools in Asia
Private schools in Brunei
Cambridge schools in Brunei
Primary schools in Brunei
Secondary schools in Brunei
Sixth form colleges in Brunei
Educational institutions established in 1997
1997 establishments in Brunei